Pradeep Yadav (born 6 December 1996) is an Indian cricketer. He made his List A debut on 22 February 2021, for Baroda in the 2020–21 Vijay Hazare Trophy.

References

External links
 

1996 births
Living people
Indian cricketers
Baroda cricketers
Place of birth missing (living people)